Sarah is a biblical matriarch and the wife of Abraham.

Sarah may also refer to:

Books
 Sarah (Card novel), a 2000 novel by Orson Scott Card
 Sarah (Johnson book), a 2008 biography of Sarah Palin
 Sarah (LeRoy novel), a 2001 novel by JT Leroy

Fictional entities 
 SARAH, a fictional smart house in the Sci Fi TV series Eureka
 Sarah, a character in the 1982 Canadian adventure romance movie Paradise
 Sarah, a character in the 2000 American fantasy-comedy TV movie Life-Size
 Sarah, an Ed, Edd n Eddy character
 Sarah, a character in the 1989 American-Canadian fantasy drama movie Prancer
 Sarah, a character in the 2007 British black comedy TV movie Dead Clever
 Sarah (Trailer Park Boys character)
 Sarah Altman, a character from the 2002 American thriller film Panic Room
 Sarah Anderson, a character in the 1987 American teen comedy film Adventures in Babysitting
 Sarah Baker, a character from the film Cheaper by the Dozen
 Sarah Braverman, a character from the TV series Parenthood
 Sarah Bryant (Virtua Fighter), a video game character from the Virtua Fighter series
 Sarah Cameron, a character from Outer Banks
 Sarah Carraclough, a character from the 2005 adventure comedy-drama film Lassie
 Sarah Carter, a character from the 2005 British horror film The Descent and its sequel
 Sarah Connor (Terminator), a character from Terminator series
 Sarah Corrigan, a character in the British sitcom Peep Show
 Sarah Darling, a character from the 2000 American horror film Scream 3
 Sarah Dean, a character in the 1988 American fantasy comedy movie Beetlejuice
 Sarah Hart, a character from the 2011 film I Am Number Four
 Sarah Hawkins, a character from the 2002 animated film Treasure Planet
 Sarah Henderson, a character in the 1987 American fantasy comedy movie Harry and the Hendersons
 Sarah Henrickson, a character on the HBO series Big Love
 Sarah Hill, a character from the 2011 drama film Soul Surfer
 Sarah Hotchner, a character in the 1998 American science-fiction disaster movie Deep Impact
 Sarah Horton, a character from Days of Our Lives
 Sarah Huttinger, one of the main characters played by Jennifer Aniston in the 2005 American romantic comedy movie Rumor Has It
 Sarah Kendrew, a character in the  2000 American romantic comedy-drama movie High Fidelity
 Sarah Kerrigan, a character in the StarCraft series and Heroes of the Storm
 Sarah MacLeod, from Highlander: The Animated Series
 Sarah Manning, a character from the 2013 Canadian television series Orphan Black
 Sarah Marshall, the main character from the 2008 film Forgetting Sarah Marshall
 Sarah McNerney, a character from the 2003 romantic comedy film Just Married
 Sarah Reeves Merrin, a character in the American television teen and family drama Party of Five
 Sarah Moffat, a fictional television character from Upstairs, Downstairs
 Sarah Monroe, a character played by Tiffany in the 2010 science fiction comedy horror movie Mega Piranha
 Sarah Palmer, a character from the mystery serial drama television series Twin Peaks
 Sarah Platt, fictional character from the British ITV soap opera Coronation Street
 Sarah Powell, a character in the American sitcom television series Charles in Charge
 Sarah Rush, a character in the American sitcom television series Too Close for Comfort
 Sarah Sanderson, a character from the 2003 comedy film Bringing Down the House
 Sarah Silverman, the main character from the American television sitcom The Sarah Silverman Program
 Sarah Jane Smith, fictional character played by Elisabeth Sladen in BBC Television science fiction series Doctor Who
 Sarah Thompson, in the Home and Away soap opera
 Sarah Walker, a character from the NBC television series Chuck
 Sarah Whittle, a character in the 1995 American fantasy adventure movie Jumanji
 Sarah Williams, the main character of the 1986 film Labyrinth, played by Jennifer Connelly
 Sarah Williams, a character of the 2000 film Waking the Dead, also played by Jennifer Connelly
 Sarah Witting, a character from the children's book and television film adaption of Sarah, Plain and Tall

Music
 "Sarah" (Eskimo Joe song), a song by Eskimo Joe from the 2006 album, Black Fingernails, Red Wine
 "Sarah" (Mauro Scocco song), a song from the 1988 album Mauro Scocco
 "Sara" (Starship song), 1986
 "Sarah" (Thin Lizzy song), a 1979 single by Thin Lizzy from the album Black Rose: A Rock Legend
 "Sarah", a song by Serge Reggiani
 "Sarah", a song by Bat for Lashes from the 2006 album Fur and Gold
 "Sarah", a song by Tyler the Creator from the 2009 album Bastard
 "Sarah", a song by America from the 1977 LP Harbor

People

 Princess Sarah Zeid of Jordan, Jordanian and Iraqi princess
 Sarah (given name)
 Sarah, Duchess of York, former British princess
 Saint Sarah, a Romani saint

Places
 Sarah, Iran
 Sarah, Kentucky, U.S.
 Sarah, West Virginia, U.S.
 Sarah-e Shadadi, Hormozgan Province, Iran

Other
 Sarah (chimpanzee), an enculturated research chimpanzee
 Sarah (cheetah), world's fastest land mammal
 Sarah (film), a 1982 Australian animated film
 Sarah (ship), a list of ships
 Sarah (TV series), a Lebanese soap opera
 Sarah Records, an independent record label from Bristol
 Yad Sarah, Israeli free-loan organization for medical and rehabilitative equipment
 "Search And Rescue And Homing", a British system for Survival radio

See also
 
 Saira (disambiguation)
 Saraa (disambiguation)
 Sara (disambiguation)